Edward Percival Peter (28 March 1902 – 23 September 1986) was an English competitive swimmer and water polo player who represented Great Britain at the 1920, 1924 and 1928 Summer Olympics.

In 1920 he won a bronze medal in the 4×200-metre relay and failed to reach the 400-metre and 1500-metre freestyle finals.  In 1924 he placed fifth in the 4×200-metre freestyle relay and third in the first round of 400-metre freestyle.  In 1928 he finished sixth in the 4×200-metre freestyle relay; he was also a member of British water polo team, which lost to France in the third place match.

References

External links
British Olympic Association athlete profile
profile

1902 births
1986 deaths
English male freestyle swimmers
English male water polo players
Olympic swimmers of Great Britain
Olympic water polo players of Great Britain
Swimmers at the 1920 Summer Olympics
Swimmers at the 1924 Summer Olympics
Swimmers at the 1928 Summer Olympics
Water polo players at the 1928 Summer Olympics
Olympic bronze medallists for Great Britain
Olympic bronze medalists in swimming
Medalists at the 1920 Summer Olympics